Renato Giusti (born 25 July 1938) is an Italian racing cyclist. He won stages 12 and 18 of the 1961 Giro d'Italia.

References

External links
 

1938 births
Living people
Italian male cyclists
Italian Giro d'Italia stage winners
Place of birth missing (living people)
Cyclists from the Province of Verona